Duncan George Stewart (22 October 1904 – 10 December 1949) CMG was a British colonial administrator and governor. He was mortally wounded in an assassination on 3 December 1949, in Sibu, Sarawak.

Early life
Stewart was born in Witkleifontein on 22 October 1904 in the Transvaal Colony now part of South Africa, and educated in England at Winchester College and  Oriel College, Oxford, where he graduated with a BA.

Career
Stewart joined the Colonial Administration Service (CAS) in 1928, and held positions as district officer at Oya Territory, Nigeria, colonial secretary in the Bahamas, secretary of finance in Mandatory Palestine, and secretary of the governorial conference in South Africa. He married and had three children.

His service record was viewed as exceptional, and because of that, he was later announced as the new governor and commander-in-chief for Sarawak by Lord Listowel, minister of state for colonial affairs, to replace Charles Arden-Clarke.

Assassination
Stewart had only been in the new role as Governor of Sarawak for a couple of weeks and was in fact on his first official visit in the colony, to the town of Sibu on 3 December 1949. According to press reports of the event he was warmly welcomed by large crowds, who all seemed to be enjoying themselves. After inspecting an honour guard and meeting a group of school children, a youth (Moshidi bin Sedek) walked towards him holding a camera claiming to want a picture. As Stewart posed, another youth (Rosli bin Dobi) stabbed him. Both youths were immediately arrested.

Despite suffering a deep stab wound Stewart is reported to have tried to carry on until blood began to seep through his white uniform. He was then quickly rushed away for treatment in Kuching but died a few days later after being flown to the General Hospital in Singapore.

The two youths were convicted of the murder and hanged. Both were believed to be members of the anti-cession movement, and dedicated to restoring Anthony Brooke to the throne of Sarawak. In fact they were both from a political group agitating for union with newly independent Indonesia. Documents released in the late 20th century indicate that the British Government knew that Brooke was not involved, but chose not to reveal the truth of the matter so as not to provoke Indonesia. It had recently won its war of independence from the Netherlands, and the UK was already dealing with the Malayan Emergency to the north-west.

References

Governors of Sarawak
1904 births
1949 deaths
Assassinated British people
Assassinated heads of government
Deaths by stabbing in Malaysia
Administrators in British Borneo
Assassinated Malaysian people
British people murdered abroad
Mandatory Palestine people
Colonial Secretaries of the Bahamas
People from colonial Nigeria
Alumni of Oriel College, Oxford
People educated at Winchester College
British expatriates in Transvaal Colony